Guleh may refer to:
Güləh, Azerbaijan
Guleh, Mahabad, West Azerbaijan Province, Iran
Guleh, Sardasht, West Azerbaijan Province, Iran